Skenidioides is an extinct genus of brachiopods which existed during the Ordovician, Silurian, and Devonian of what is now Australia, Canada, China, the Czech Republic, Italy, Morocco, Poland, Ukraine, the United States, Belarus, Estonia, Lithuania, Mexico, Norway, Sweden, the United Kingdom, Venezuela, Ireland, Kazakhstan, the Russian Federation, and Argentina. It was described by Schuchert and Cooper in 1931, and the type species is S. billingsi. A new species, S. tatyanae, was described by Andrzej Baliński in 2012, from the early Devonian of Ukraine. The species epithet refers to Tatyana Lvovna Modzalevskaya.

Species
 Skenidioides billingsi Schuchert & Cooper, 1931
 Skenidioides cretus Halamski in Baliński, Racki & Halamski, 2016
 Skenidioides kayseri Benedetto, 2003
 Skenidioides anthonense 
 Skenidioides tatyanae Baliński, 2012

References

External links
 Skenidioides at the Paleobiology Database

Prehistoric brachiopod genera
Paleozoic life of Ontario
Paleozoic life of British Columbia
Paleozoic life of New Brunswick
Paleozoic life of the Northwest Territories
Paleozoic life of Nunavut
Paleozoic life of Quebec
Paleozoic life of Yukon